The 1927 municipal election was held December 12, 1927 to elect a mayor and five aldermen to sit on Edmonton City Council and four trustees to sit on each of the public and separate school boards.  There were also two plebiscite questions.

There were ten aldermen on city council, but five of the positions were already filled: Charles Gibbs, Alfred Farmilo, Charles Robson, George Hazlett, and Herbert Baker were all elected to two-year terms in 1926 and were still in office.

There were seven trustees on the public school board, but three of the positions were already filled:  Samuel Barnes, Thyrza Bishop, and J A Herlihy (SS) had all been elected to two-year terms in 1926 and were still in office.  The same was true on the separate board, where Harry Carrigan, J O Pilon, and W D Trainor were continuing.

This election was the last to be conducted using the single transferable vote system, as a plebiscite held concurrently with the election resulted in Edmontonians voting to return to a block voting system.

Voter turnout

There were 12,907 ballots cast out of 37,106 eligible voters, for a voter turnout of 34.7%.

Results

 bold or  indicates elected
 italics indicate incumbent
 "SS", where data is available, indicates representative for Edmonton's South Side, with a minimum South Side representation instituted after the city of Strathcona, south of the North Saskatchewan River, amalgamated into Edmonton on February 1, 1912.

Mayor

Aldermen

Because of the Single Transferable Vote system, Keillor and Findlay initially received more votes than Dineen, but Dineen, not them, won a seat, due to having more votes at the end (caused by votes transferred from other candidates).

Public school trustees

Separate (Catholic) school trustees

Plebiscites

Assessing Improvements on Industrial Establishments

To authorize the Council to fix the Assessment of improvements for industrial establishments.
Yes - 2,224
No - 1,038

Abolition of Single Transferable Vote

To abolish the Proportional Representation System of electing mayor and aldermen.
Yes - 6,695
No - 5,473

References

Election History, City of Edmonton: Elections and Census Office

1927
1927 elections in Canada
1927 in Alberta